is a comedy anime series based on the manga series UFO Princess Valkyrie. A total of 32 episodes and one specially released OVA episode were produced. Seasons 1 and 2 were broadcast in Japan on Kids Station between 2002 and 2004. The anime series was released on DVD in Japan between 2002 and 2006.  All episodes and the special were dubbed in English and released as DVD collections in North America by ADV Films from 2006 to 2007.

Episode list

UFO Ultramaiden Valkyrie (TV)

OVAs

UFO Ultramaiden Valkyrie 2: December Nocturne (TV)

UFO Ultramaiden Valkyrie 3

Part 1: Bride of Celestial Souls' Day (OVA)

Part 2: Banquet of Time, Dreams, and Galaxies (OVA)

UFO Princess Valkyrie: SPECIAL - Bridal Training
Directed by	Tetsuya Yanagisawa
Released	October 5, 2006
Runtime	24 minutes

Music themes
Opening and ending themes used in each episode for the four season releases and the OVA are listed. Also list is the incidental music used in certain episodes.

Opening Theme (Season 1)
"Itoshii Kakera" by Melocure

Ending Theme (Season 1)
"Save" by Hisayo Mochizuki

Opening Theme (Season 2)
"Meguriai" by Melocure

Ending Theme (Season 2)
"Marble" by Hisayo Mochizuki, Chinami Nishimura, Rie Tanaka and Saeko Chiba

Opening Theme (Season 3)
"Natsu no Mukougawa" by Meg Hinata (#1–4)
"One Kiss" by Megumi Ogata (#5–6)

Ending Theme (Season 3)
"Uchuu no Hana" by Kikuko Inoue, Mai Kadowaki, and Yuu Asakawa (#1–4)
"Sorekara" by Kenichi Suzumura (#5–6)

Incidental "Love Song"
"Agape" by Melocure

Incidental Talent Show Song (By Little Valkyrie)
"Suki-Suki-Suki wa na Kanji (I Love it, Love it, Love it, Feels like Harmony):
by Hisayo Mochizuki

Incidental Talent Show Song (By Big Valkyrie)
"Princess of December" by Megumi Ogata

See also 
List of UFO Ultramaiden Valkyrie characters

External links
 Official Tokinoyu: UFO Princess Valkyrie 
 
 
 
 
 

UFO Ultramaiden Valkyrie